The Cementerio Municipal de Mayagüez, also known as Cementerio Viejo, was constructed in 1876 in Mayaguez, Puerto Rico. It was designed by the municipal architect Félix Vidal d’Ors following the master plan for the city from 1804. The outskirts of the cemetery are defined by brick walls and niches, the area is divided by two streets that intersect.  Following an 1872 law the cemetery provided separated areas intended for non-Catholics and for the poor, located in the east.

It was listed on the National Register of Historic Places in 1988.  The listing includes two contributing buildings, one contributing site, and five other contributing structures. It is one of the most elegant and carefully designed cemeteries on the island.

Notable interments
 Tulio Larrínaga, former Resident Commissioner of Puerto Rico from 1905 – 1911
 Alicia Moreda, actress/comedian
 Juan Mari Bras, founder of the Movimiento Pro Independencia and the modern Puerto Rican Socialist Party
 María Luisa Arcelay,  educator, businesswoman and politician
 Mon Rivera musician
 Juancho Bascarán, mayor of Las Marias, fought in the Spanish–American War
 Mariano Riera Palmer, mayor of Mayaguez
 Pedro Juan Rúa Rullán, influential author and college professor and grandson of former Mayagüez mayor Juan Rullán Rivera

References

External links
 
 

1876 establishments in Puerto Rico
National Register of Historic Places in Mayagüez, Puerto Rico
Cemeteries on the National Register of Historic Places in Puerto Rico
Neoclassical architecture in Puerto Rico